The Sarancha class is the NATO reporting name for a hydrofoil missile boat built for the Soviet Navy. The Soviet designation was Project 1240 Uragan (Серия 1240 Ураган- Hurricane).

Design

The boat was a very complex design. Unlike previous Soviet hydrofoil boats the Project 1240 had fully submerged foils with propellers mounted on the after set of foils. It was deemed too large, complex and expensive for series production and only a prototype boat was built.

Missile boat MRK-5

The MRK-5 (МРК-5) was laid down at the Petrovski plant in Leningrad in 1973 and was on trials until 1977. In 1979, she was transferred to the Black Sea Fleet via Russian inland waterways. She was based in Sevastopol until 1990, when she was decommissioned. In 1992, she was damaged by fire and sunk in shallow water. The wreck was raised and scrapped.

See also
List of ships of the Soviet Navy
List of ships of Russia by project number
HMCS Bras d'Or (FHE 400), a Canadian hydrofoil intended for anti-submarine duties
HMS Speedy (P296), a Royal Navy Jetfoil mine countermeasure vessel.
Pegasus-class hydrofoil, a class of USN PHM
Matka-class missile boat, a class of Soviet PHM
Sparviero-class patrol boat, a class of Italian PHM

References

Notes

Bibliography
 Also published as

External links
Project 1240 Uragan article on the Encyclopedia of Ships 
The Black Sea Fleet's page on the MRK-5 
Atrina website article on the MRK-5 
Ship list and information for the Sarancha class missile boat

Missile boat classes
Missile boats of the Soviet Navy
Cold War missile boats of the Soviet Union
Hydrofoils